Faro-et-Déo  is a department of Adamawa Province in Cameroon.
The department covers an area of 10,435 km and as of 2001 had a total population of 66,442. The capital of the department lies at Tignere.

Subdivisions
The department is divided administratively into arrondissements and communes and in turn into villages.

Arrondissements
Galim-Tignère 
Mayo-Baléo (1 district : Kontcha) 
Tignère

Communes
The department has 4 communes:

Galim-Tignère 
Mayo-Baléo 
Tignère 
Kontcha

See also
Communes of Cameroon

References

Departments of Cameroon
Adamawa Region